The Vasava are an Adivasi clan of the Bhil ethnic community found in the states of Gujarat, Maharashtra and Rajasthan in India. They have scheduled tribe status. In Rajasthan, they are also known as Vasave.

Origin 

The Vasava are a Bhil sub-group of the larger Adivasi ethnos. some Sanskritized Vasava in Gujarat trace their mythological descent from Eklavya. They originally hail from south Gujarat and Madhya Pradesh. The community are now found in districts of Baroda, Surat, Bharuch, Narmada and Panchmahal.They speak their native Bhili language, although most can now also speak Gujarati.

The Vasave in Maharashtra are found mainly in the Khandesh region. Their settlements exist mainly in the hilly and forest terrain of the Satpuda range. The Vasave speak the Bhil language, but most also speak Marathi. The Vasave are mainly a community of farmers, with animal husbandry being a secondary occupation. About 80% of the Vasave are Hindu, while the other 20% are Christians.

Present circumstances 

The Vasava of Gujarat are an endogamous community and maintain village exogamy. Many are now agricultural labourers, and a few also own land. Those who own land grow paddy, sorghum, wheat, cereals and different kinds of pulses. Analogous to their wider Bhil community, they are non-vegetarian. Vasava still preserve many of their own ancestral indigenous pre Hindu folk beliefs.

, the Vasava in Rajasthan were classified as a Scheduled Tribe under the Indian government's reservation program of positive discrimination.

See also 

rathwa 
koli people
rathwi Bareli
Languages of India
Gujarati language
Gujarati people
Languages with official status in India
List of Indian languages by total speakers
 narmada

References

Bhil clans
Social groups of Gujarat
Tribal communities of Gujarat
Social groups of Maharashtra
Scheduled Tribes of Rajasthan